The XI Corps of the Ottoman Empire (Turkish: 11 nci Kolordu or On Birinci Kolordu) was one of the corps of the Ottoman Army. It was formed in the early 20th century during Ottoman military reforms.

Formation 
With further reorganizations of the Ottoman Army, to include the creation of corps level headquarters, by 1911 the XI Corps was headquartered in Van. The Corps before the First Balkan War in 1911 was structured as such:

XI Corps, Van
33rd Infantry Division, Van
88th Infantry Regiment, Van
89th Infantry Regiment, Başkale
90th Infantry Regiment, Bayezit
33rd Rifle Battalion, Van
33rd Division Band, Van
34th Infantry Division, Muş
91st Infantry Regiment, Muş
92nd Infantry Regiment, Malazgirt
93rd Infantry Regiment, Kara Kilise
34th Rifle Battalion, Yemen
34th Division Band, Muş
Units of IX Corps
23rd Cavalry Regiment, Van
21st Field Artillery Battalion, Van
11th Transport Battalion, Van
22nd Mountain Artillery Battalion
Border companies x 8

Balkan Wars

Order of Battle, July 1913 
XI Corps (Caucasus)
34th Division

World War I

Order of Battle, August 1914, November 1914, April 1915, Late Summer 1915, January 1916, August 1916 
In August 1914, November 1914, Late April 1915, Summer 1915, January 1916, August 1916, the corps was structured as follows:

XI Corps (Caucasus)
18th Division, 33rd Division, 34th Division

Sources

Corps of the Ottoman Empire
Military units and formations of the Ottoman Empire in World War I
History of Van, Turkey